Pasargad County is in Fars province, Iran. The capital of the county is the city of Saadat Shahr. At the 2006 census, the county's population was 29,825 in 7,100 households. The following census in 2011 counted 31,504 people in 8,364 households. At the 2016 census, the county's population was 30,118 in 8,813 households.

Administrative divisions

The population history and structural changes of Pasargad County's administrative divisions over three consecutive censuses are shown in the following table. The latest census shows two districts, four rural districts, and two cities.

References

 

Counties of Fars Province